The puna thistletail (Asthenes helleri) is a species of bird in the family Furnariidae. It is found in Peru and Bolivia.

Its natural habitats are subtropical or tropical moist montane forest and subtropical or tropical high-altitude grassland.

References

puna thistletail
Birds of the Peruvian Andes
Birds of the Bolivian Andes
puna thistletail
Taxonomy articles created by Polbot